The 1935 Pau Grand Prix was a motor race held on 24 February 1935 at the Pau circuit, in Pau, Pyrénées-Atlantiques, France. The Grand Prix was won by Tazio Nuvolari, driving the Alfa Romeo Tipo B. René Dreyfus finished second and Luigi Soffietti third.

Classification

Race

References

Pau Grand Prix
1935 in French motorsport